This is a list of past programs aired on ZOE TV Channel 11 via DZOE-TV. For the currently aired shows on A2Z, see List of programs broadcast by A2Z (Philippine TV channel) and for Light TV 33, see List of programs broadcast by Light TV. For the past programs via GMA Network's / Citynet's blocktime agreement, see List of programs previously broadcast by QTV, Q, GMA News TV and GTV.

Local programming

Current affairs
Aksyon Time (2021–2022) 1
Iba 'Yan! (2020–2021) 1
Paano Kita Mapasasalamatan?   (2020–2021) 1

1 under A2Z

Drama
 2 Good 2 Be True (2022) 2
  A Family Affair (2022) 2
 Ang sa Iyo Ay Akin (2020–2021) 2
 FPJ's Ang Probinsyano (2015–2022) 2
 Bagong Umaga (2020–2021) 2
 Be My Lady (2016, 2022; re-run) 2
 Bagani (2018, 2022; re-run) 2
 Bayan Ko (2013)1
 Bawal Lumabas: The Series (2021) 2
 The Broken Marriage Vow (2022) 2
 Bola Bola (2022) 2
 Click, Like, Share (2021–2022) 2
 Dahil sa Iyong Paglisan (2006–2008) 1
 Flower of Evil (2022; 2022–2023 re-run) 2
 He's Into Her (2021–2022) 2
 Hoy, Love You! (2021–2022) 2 
 Huwag Kang Mangamba (2021) 2
 Init sa Magdamag (2021, 2022; re-run) 2
 Katipunan (2013) 1
 La Vida Lena (2021–2022) 2
 Love Thy Woman (2021–2022; re-run) 2
 Love in 40 Days (2022) 2
 Lyric and Beat (2022) 2
 Magpahanggang Wakas (2021; re-run) 2
 Marry Me, Marry You (2021–2022) 2
 Mars Ravelo's Darna (2022–2023) 2
 Maalaala Mo Kaya (1991–2022) 1
 My Guardian Abby (2005–2006) 1
 Nang Ngumiti ang Langit (2021–2022; re-run) 2
 Noel (2006) 1
 Posh (produced by Viva Television, 2006) 1
 The Good Son (2020–2021) 2
 Run To Me (2022) 2
 Titser (2013) 1
 Unloving U (2021) 2
 Wagas (2013–2019) 1
 Viral Scandal (2021–2022)2
 Walang Hanggang Paalam (2020–2021) 2

1 under Q / GMA News TV 
2 under A2Z

Comedy
 Ay, Robot! (2005–2007) 1
 Camera Cafe (2007–2009) 1
 Family Zoo (2006) 1
 Ganda ng Lola Ko (2005–2006) 1
 H3O: Ha Ha Ha Over (2005–2007) 1
 I Laugh Sabado (2010–2011) 1
 Laugh to Laugh: Ang Kulit! (2005–2006) 1
 May Tamang Balita (2011–2013) 1
 My Papa Pi (2022) 2
 O Mare Ko (2005–2006) 1
 Project 11 (2005–2006) 1
 
1 under Q 
2 under A2Z

Game
 Everybody, Sing! (2021–2023) 2
 I Can See Your Voice (season 3) (2020–2021) 2
 I Can See Your Voice (season 4) (2022) 2
 Iba Na ang Matalino: The Nutroplex Brain Challenge (2007) 1
 Now Na! (2006–2007) 1
 Takeshi's Castle (2006, 2010) 1

1 under Q 
2 under A2Z

Reality
 Aja! Aja! Tayo sa Jeju (2021) 1
 Day Off (2005–2019) 1
 Dream Maker: Search For the Next Global Pop Group (2022–2023) 1
 Fam Jam (2005–2006) 1
 Follow the Star (2011–2014) 1
 Here Comes the Bride (2007) 1
 I-Shine Talent Camp TV (2011) 1
 Pinoy Big Brother: Connect (2020–2021) 2
 Popstar Kids (2005–2007) 1
 Show Ko! (2005–2006) 1
 The Smiths (2011) 1
 Stars on Ice (2007) 1
 Your Face Sounds Familiar (season 3) (2021) 2

1 under Q 
2 under A2Z

News
 A2Z News Alert (2020; temporary program only)4
 Balita Pilipinas Primetime (2011–2014) 1
 Balita Pilipinas Ngayon (2011–2019) 1
 Balitanghali (2005–2019) 1
 Balitanghali Weekend (2010–2019) 1
 Dobol B sa News TV (2011–2012, 2017–2019) 1
 Flash Report sa QTV (2006–2007) 1
 Kape at Balita (2012–2013) 1
 Live on Q (2007–2011) 1
 News on Q (2005–2011) 1
 News Light (2020) 3
 News on Q Update (2005–2006) 1
 News to Go (2011–2019) 1
 News TV Live (2011–2019) 1
 News TV Quick Response Team (2011–2019) 1
 On Call: Serbisyong Totoo. Ngayon. (2011–2012) 1
 Review Philippines (2007–2008) 1
 State of the Nation with Jessica Soho (2011–2019) 1
 ZOE Balita Ngayon (1998–2005) 2
 ZOE News Round-up (1998–2005) 2

1 under Q / GMA News TV
2 under ZOE TV 11
3 under Light TV 33 simulcast
4 under A2Z

Documentary
 Bongga Ka Star (2006) 1
 Chances Are (2009–2010) 1
 DoQmentaries (2008–2009) 1
 Front Row (2011–2014) 1
 Investigative Documentaries (2011–2019) 1
 Misteryo (2009–2010) 1
 Motorcycle Diaries (2011–2017) 1
 Na-Scam Ka Na Ba? (2006) 1
 One Proud Mama (2008–2009) 1
 Proudly Filipina (2008–2009) 1
 Pusong Wagi (2005–2006) 1
 Reel Time (2011–2019) 1
 True Stories (2010–2011) 1
 Weekend Getaway (2011–2013) 1

1 under Q / GMA News TV

Public affairs
 Adyenda (2005–2018) 1 2
 Aksyon Time (2021–2022) 4
 Daily Service Show (1998–2000) 2
 Diyos at Bayan (1998–2019, 2020) 1234
 Draw the Line (2005–2009, formerly Women's Desk) 1
 Iba 'Yan! (2020–2021) 4
 Legal Forum (2004–2017) 123
 Paano Kita Mapasasalamatan? (2020–2021) 4
 Serbisyong Legal (2004–2005) 2
 Shout Out: Sigaw ng Kabataan! (2016–2018) 1
 Talking Points with Rose Solangon (2015–2019) 1

1 under Q / GMA News TV
2 under ZOE TV 11
3 under Light TV 33 simulcast
4 under A2Z

Informative
 Asenso Pinoy (2020–2023) 2
 At Your Service-Star Power (2005–2007) 1
 The Awesome Life (2019) 1
 Balikbayan (2005–2011) 1
 The Beat (2006–2011, formerly Sapulso) 1
 Best Men (2011–2013) 1
 Boarding Pass (2014) 1
 Candies (2005–2006) 1
 Chef To Go (2007–2009) 1
 Daddy-licious (2009) 1
 Del Monte Kitchenomics (2011) 1
 Everyday Easy (2013–2014)  1
 Fans Kita (2005–2006)  1
 Fashbook (2011–2014) 1
 Fashionistas by Heart (2008–2010) 1
 Fil It Up with Mig Ayesa and Sophie Sumner (2015)  1
 Filipknow (2012–2015) 1
 Fit & Fab 
 Gandang Ricky Reyes (2005–2010) 1
 Hamon ng Kalikasan (2012) 1
 Happy Life (2016) 1
 Hashtag Pinoy (2015–2019) 1
 Healthcetera with Dr. Manny and Dra. Pie Calayan (2015) 1
 Healthy Cravings (2010–2011) 1
 The Healthy Life (2012–2015) 1
 Hired! (2005–2009, formerly May Trabaho Ka) 1
 I Love Pinas (2011–2015) 1
 Idol sa Kusina (2011–2019) 1
 Ka-Toque: Lutong Barkada (2005–2009) 1
 Kids HQ (2016–2018) 1
 Kids on Q (2007–2010) 1
 Life and Style With Ricky Reyes1 (2010–2019) 1
 Liga ng Kababaihan (2005–2006) 1
 Living It Up (2007–2009) 1
 Lovelife (2005–2007) 1
 Masigasig (2007) 1
 Miya (2007, re-aired 2008 & 2009) 1
 My Favorite Recipes (2009–2010) 1
 Nancy Lumen: The Pinoy Foodie1 (2011–2012)
 OrganiqueTV (2015–2017) 1
 Ang Pinaka (2005–2019) 1
 Pinas Sarap (2017–2019) 1
 Pisobilities (2012–2018) 1
 Pop Talk (2011–2019) 1
 Power House (2011–2014) 1
 Power Review (2010–2011) 1
 Q Tube (2009–2010) 1
 Q-Lets and Co. (2010) 1
 Quickfire: 10-minute Kitchen Wonders (2008–2012) 1
 Reunions (2005–2011, formerly Sanay Muling Magkapiling) 1
 Road Trip (2012–2019) 1
 RX Men (2005–2008) 1
 Sarap at Home (2009–2012) 1
 Sarap with Family (2013–2017) 1
 Sus Naman! (2010–2011) 1
 Tara! Lets Eat! (2009–2011) 1
 Taste Buddies (2012–2019) 1
 The Sweet Life (2007–2011) 1
 Tiny Kitchen (2015–2016) 1
 Tripinas (2015) 1
 Tropang Potchi (2009–2011) 1
 Turbo Zone, Feed Your Drive!  1
 TWGRR: D'World of Gandang Ricky Reyes  1
 Ugaling Wagi (2013–2015) 1
 Vintage Trip (2016) 1
 The Working Class  1 
 X-Life (2010–2011) 1

1 with Q / GMA News TV

Talk
 Bawal ang Pasaway kay Mareng Winnie (2011–2019) 1
 Full Time Moms (2009–2011) 1
 Gabe Me a Break (2006–2007) 1
 In the Limelight (2011) 1
 The Gud Nite Show (2008) 1
 Love Hotline (2013–2014)  1
 Mars (2012–2019) 1
 Moms (2005–2009) 1 
 Personalan: Ang Unang Hakbang (2011–2013) 1
 Power House (2011–2014) 1
 The Ricky Lo Exclusives (2007–2009) 1
 Showbiz Exclusives (2011–2012) 1
 The Sobrang Gud Nite Show with Jojo A All the Way! (2007–2008) 1
 Tonight with Arnold Clavio (2010–2019) 1
 Tweetbiz: The Bizniz of Chizmiz (2009–2011) 1
 Tweetbiz Insiders (2011) 1

1 under Q / GMA News TV

Kid-oriented
 Just 4 Kids (2014) 2
 Kids Against Crime (2000–2002) 1
 Kids Club (2000–2002)  1
 Kids HQ (2016–2018) 2
 Kids on Q (2007–2010) 2
 Planet Q (2007–2008) 2

1 under ZOE TV
2 under Q / GMA News TV

Variety
 JAM (2015–2018) 1
 Let's Get Aww!!! (produced by TAPE Inc., 2005–2006) 1
 MINT: Music Interactive (2005) 1
 MMS: My Music Station (2005–2007) 1
 This Is My Story, This Is My Song (2012–2018) 1

1 under Q / GMA News TV

Other programs
3R (2005–2006) 1
Armor of God (2011–2012) 1
Baywalk (2005) 1
Be Alive (2012–2013) 1
Bluffing with Paolo and Bodie (2010) 1
Coney Reyes on Camera (2002–2003) 3
Dare Duo (2009) 1
Day Off1 (2005–2019)
The Debutante (2008) 1
Design para sa Lahat1 (2012)
Dishkarte of the Day (2016) 1
The Dr. Tess Show (2014) 1
Events Incorporated (2009–2010) 1
Extra Challenge Reloaded (2006) 1
Extreme Makeover (2006–2007) 1
The Final Cut (2006) 1
Full Time Moms (2009–2011) 1
Gabe me a Break (2006–2007) 1
Ganda Ng Lola Ko (2005–2006) 1
Gandang Ricky Reyes (2005–2010) 1
Ginang Fashionista (2005) 1
Groupee TV (2005) 1
Hapinas (2006–2008) 1
Hayop Atbp. (2010–2011) 1
Healthy Cravings (2010–2011) 1
Healthcetera with Dr. Manny and Dra. Pie Calayan (2015) 1
Hollywood Boot Camp (2007) 1
Home Base1 (2012–2015)
Just Kidding (2010) 1
Ka-Toque: Lutong Barkada (2005–2009) 1
Last Woman Standing (2007–2008) 1
Life and Style With Ricky Reyes1 (2010–2019) 1
Life Rocks (2015) 1
Living It Up (2007–2009) 1
Luv U Pet with Jamie Fournier and Lestre Zapanta (2015) 1
Mga Waging Kuwento ng OFW (2007–2008) 1
Michelle Simone's Entertains (2007) 1
Miya (2007) 1
Mommy Diary (2009) 1
Mommy Elvie at 181
My Favorite Recipes (2009–2010) 1
MyHouse Today (season 3) (2015) 1
Na-Scam Ka Na Ba? (2006) 1
Nancy Lumen: The Pinoy Foodie1 (2011–2012)
Nang Magising si Juan1 (2014) 
O Mare Ko (2005–2006) 1
One Proud Mama (2008–2009) 1
Philippine Explorer (2008–2010) 1
Planet Q (2007–2008) 1
Proudly Filipina (2006–2009) 1
Psalty The Bible Show (2002–2005) 3
Puso Mo sa Amerika (2008, two times) 1
Pusong Wagi (2005–2006) 1
Quigley's Village (2001–2005) 3
Q-Lets & Co. (2010) 1
Remix Report (2011–2012) 1
The Ricky Lo Exclusives (2007–2009)  1
Ripley's Believe It Or Not 1
The Rock Of My Salvation (2003–2005) 3
RunnerSpeak (2009–2010) 1
Sarap At Home1 (2009–2012)
Sarap to Heart1 (2012)
Sarap with Family1 (2013–2019)
Say Mo Doc (2014) 1
Show Ko! (2005–2006) 1
Showbiz Exclusives1 (2011–2012)
SME GO! Powered by Go Negosyo1 (2012–2013)
Smile TV (2010–2011) 1
The Smiths (2011) 1
Survivor Philippines: Palau (2010) 1
Tropang Potchi (2009–2011) 1
True Confections (2008–2010) 1
Weddings TV (2014–2015) 1
Weekend Getaway (2011–2013) 1
Word of Mouth (2009) 1
You Women (2009) 1

1under Q /  GMA News TV
2under A2Z
3under ZOE TV 11

Informercials
 EZ Shop (2004–2005, 2016) 12
 Shop at Home (1998–2000) 2
 Shop Japan (2016) 1
 Shop TV (2015–2019) 1
 Value Vision (1998–2005) 2
 Winner TV Shopping (2002–2005) 2
1under GMA News TV
2under ZOE TV 11

Film and special presentation
 Asian Horror Stories (2016) 1
 Cinema Klasika (2012–2013) 1
 Ginintuang Telon (2005–2006) 1
 Primetime Zinema (2020–2021) 2
 Rated: Chick Flicks (2008–2011) 1
 Sabado Showdown (2005–2009) 1
 Sine Sabado (2012–2014) 1
 Sunday Super Sine (2005–2008) 1
 Sunday Zine Hits (2020) 2
 Takilya Blockbusters (2012–2017) 1
 True Horror Stories (2016) 1

1under Q /  GMA News TV
2under A2Z

Religious
 Jesus the Healer (2005–present) 1234
 Life Giver (2012–2019) 1 5
 Light Up (2011–2019) 1
 River of Worship (2016–2019) 1
 Midnight Prayer Helps (2006–2019) 13
 PJM Forum (1998–2019) 1 3
 The 700 Club Asia (2003–2005, 2006–2015) 1 2
 The Healing Eucharist: Easter Vigil Mass (2021–2022) 5
 The Healing Eucharist: Celebration of the Lord's Supper (2021–2022) 5
 The Healing Eucharist: Veneration of the Cross (2021–2022) 5
 The Seven Last Words (Produced by Mission Communications Foundation, Inc.) (2021–2022) 5
 Worship Word & Wonders (2018–2019) 1 3 5
1 under Q / GMA News TV 
2 under ZOE TV 11 
3 under Light TV 33 simulcast 
4 under A2Z 
5 under A2Z (Holy Week special only)

Foreign programming

Animation
Absolute Boy1
The Adventures of Hello Kitty & Friends1
The Adventures of Tom Sawyer2
Ah! My Goddess1
Alice's Adventures in Wonderland1
AM Driver1
Angel's Friends1
Anne of Green Gables12
Aria (except Aria the Origination)1
Astro Boy1
Bakugan Battle Brawlers1
Bannertail1
Battle B-Daman1
BB-Daman Bakugaiden1
Blue's Clues (2005–2006)1
 A Bunch of Munsch1
Burst Angel1
The Bush Baby1
Codename: Kids Next Door (2008–2010) (original English audio) 1
Camp Lazlo (2008–2010) (original English audio) 1
Cardcaptor Sakura1
Cardcaptor Sakura: Clear Card2
Cedie, Ang Munting Prinsipe2
Charlotte2
Cheeky Angel1
Cinderella 1
D.N.Angel1
Dog of Flanders (1975 TV series) 1
Dog of Flanders (1992 TV series)2
Doraemon (2005)2
Dragon Tales (2006–2009)1
Dragon Ball1
Elementar Gerad1
Extreme Ghostbusters1
The Flying House23
Foster's Home for Imaginary Friends (2008–2010) (original English audio) 1
Galaxy Adventures of Oz1
Gransazers1
Grimm's Fairy Tales1
Hamtaro1
Haruka1
Hayate the Combat Butler1
Heidi1
Hello! Lady Lynn1
Hikaru no Go1
Honey Honey1
Idaten Jump1
Initial D1
Ironman 281
Jeanie with the Light Brown Hair1
Judy Abbott / Daddy Long Legs12
The Jungle Book1
Justirisers1
Jetman1
Kaleido Star1
The Karate Kid1
Kiddy Grade1
Kirby1
Kiteretsu1
Kuma no Ko Jacky (Jackie & Jill)1
Lady Lady1
Liveman1
Lalabel, The Magical Girl1
Last Exile1
Legend of the Dragon1
Little Women II2
Love Hina1
Lulu The Flower Angel1
Maid Sama!1
Make Way for Noddy1
Marco12
Masha and the Bear2
Martin Mystery1
Men In Black1
Moby Dick1
Monster Buster Club1
My Gym Partner's a Monkey (2008–2010) (original English audio) 1
My Little Pony and Friends1
Naruto Shippuden (2021; season 4)2
My Melody 1
Olympus Guardian 1
Otogi Zoshi 1
Outlaw Star 1
Ozu no Mahōtsukai 1
Pac-Man and the Ghostly Adventures 1
Peacemaker Kurogane 1
Peach Girl 1 
Perrine 1
Peter Pan and Wendy2
Pichi Pichi Pitch 1 1
PJ Masks2
Poochini 1
Popolocrois 1
Pororo the Little Penguin (2021) 2
Power Rangers Ninja Steel (2021) 2
The Powerpuff Girls (2008–2010) (original English audio) 1
The Prince of Tennis 1
Princess Sarah 2
Prudence Investigations 1
Rascal 1
Remi, Nobody's Girl 2
Rockman Axess 1
Sabrina: The Animated Series 1
Sabrina's Secret Life 1
Samurai X 1
Scrapped Princess 1
SD Gundam Force 1
Shugo Chara 1
Shaman King 1
Sky Dancers 1
The Snow Queen 1
Sonic X 1
Sorcerer Orphen Revenge 1
SpongeBob SquarePants (original English audio) 1
Super Robot Monkey Team Hyperforce Go! (original English audio) 1
Striker Hungry Heart 1
Superbook (classic3 and reboot 2 series)
Sugar: A Little Snow Fairy 1
Sugar Sugar Rune 1
Tactics 1
Tayo the Little Bus (2021) 2
Team Galaxy 1
Those Who Hunt Elves 1
Tom & Jerry Kids 1
The Tom and Jerry Show 1
Tom and Jerry Tales 1
Tomorrow's Nadja 1
Transformers Animated (original English audio) 1
Transformers: Armada 1
Transformers Beast Machines 1
The Trapp Family / The Trapp Family Singers12
Tsubasa Chronicle 1
The Twelve Kingdoms 1
Twin Princesses of Wonder Planet 1
Ultimate Book of Spells 1
Twin Spica  1
Vision of Escaflowne 1
Wonderballs! 1
World's Famous Tales 1
YAWARA!: A Fashionable Judo Girl! 1
Yucie 1
Zentrix 1
Zipang 1

1 under Q / GMA News TV 
2 under A2Z
3 under ZOE TV 11

American

Programming block
CNBC on ZOE TV 1 
E! on Q 2 
Hillsong Channel 1
Isla on ZOE TV 1

1 under ZOE TV 11
2 under Q / GMA News TV

Reality
American Idol (2012–2016)1 
Amnesia 1 
Are You Smarter Than A Fifth Grader? (2007-2009) 1 
 Kings of Restoration  1 
The Cut 1 
Lip Sync Battle  1 
My Dad Is Better Than Your Dad 1 
 Pawn Stars  1 
Power of 10 1 
Stylista 1 
Survivor: Gabon 1 
Survivor: Philippines 1 
Survivor: Tocantins 1

1 under Q / GMA News TV

Design/home improvement
Guess Who's Coming to Decorate1
Mansions1
My Celebrity Home1

1 under Q / GMA News TV

Gag
The Planet's Funniest Animals (2007-2009, 2012–2013)1
1 under Q / GMA News TV

Japanese show
 Iron Chef 1 under Q / GMA News TV
1 under Q / GMA News TV

Series
Almost Paradise2
Batman 1
Drop Dead Diva 1 
House M.D. 1
Joan of Arcadia 1
Lois & Clark 1
Wonder Woman 1
1 under Q / GMA News TV
2 under A2Z

Informational
Ancient Aliens (2016) 1
Biography (2012) 1
The Blue Planet (2012) 1
Confidentials 1
Dr. Phil
Earthflight (2013) 1
Great Migrations (2014) 1
Human Planet (2013) 1
Life in the Undergrowth (2012) 1
Mankind The Story of All of Us (2013) 1
Planet Earth (2012) 1
Planet's Funniest Animals 1
Prehistoric Park 1
Serial Killer Earth (2016) 1
Sport Science (2015) 1
Stan Lee's Superhumans (2013) 1
Top 20 Funniest (2016) 1
Wild Case Files (2013) 1

1 under Q / GMA News TV

Asian
Asia's Next Top Model 1

1 under Q / GMA News TV

Koreanovelas
 A Rosy Life 1
 All For Love 1
 All In 1
 Alone in Love 1
  All About Eve 1
 April Kiss 1
 Beethoven Virus 1
 Bodyguard 1
 Bong Dal-Hee, The Surgeon 1
 Bride of the Water God1
 Celebrity Sweethearts 1
 Cinderella and the Four Knights1
 Coffee Prince1
 Come and Hug Me2
 Dong Yi1
 Endless Love 1
 Autumn in My Heart 1
 Winter Sonata 1
 Extraordinary You1
 Fashion 70's 1
 Fireworks 1
 Fly High 1
 Foxy Lady 1
 Full House1 (rerun 2017)
 Future's Choice1
 Glass Slippers 1
 Golden Apple 1
 The Good Manager1
 Guardian Angel 1
 Hearts of 19 1
 Hello God 1
 Hong Kong Express 1
 Hotelier 1
 House Husband 1
 Into the World Again
 Irene 1
 King of Ambition1
 Legendary Women1
 Love in Heaven 1
 Love Story in Harvard 1
 Love Truly 1
 Lovers in Prague 1
 Meow: the Secret Boy2
 Melting Me Softly2
 My Absolute Boyfriend1
 Mamaw-in-Law1
 Marrying My Daughter Twice1
 Mirror of the Witch1 
 Miss Kim's Million Dollar Quest 1
 Money War 1
 My Name Is Kim Sam Soon 1
 My 19 Year Old Sister-in-Law 1
 New Heart 1
 Night after Night 1
 On Air 1
 One Fine Day 1
 Over the Greenfields 1
 Phoenix 1
 Pinocchio1
 Powerful Opponents 1
 Pretty Woman1 
 Prime Minister and I1 
 Reply 19971 
 Saimdang: Soulmates Across Time1 
 Secret Garden1 
 Secret Hotel1 
 Secret Love1 
 Single Again 1
 Sorry, I Love You 1
 Stairway to Heaven 1
 Summer Beach 1
 Super Rookie 1
 Sweet Spy 1
 Temptation1 
 Thank You 1
 The Liar and His Lover1
 The Master's Sun1 
 The Producers1
 Touch Your Heart2
 Tree of Heaven
 Two Mothers1
 Typhoon in That Summer 1
 Where Stars Land1
 Wish Upon A Star 1
 Women in the Sun1
 Worlds Within 1

1 under Q / GMA News TV
2 under A2Z

Sageuk
 Dal-ja's Spring 1
 Damo 1
 Emperor of the Sea 1
 Empress Ki1
 Jewel in the Palace1 (rerun 2018)
 Jumong 1
 Land of Wind 1
 Queen Seondeok1
 Song of the Prince1
 The Legend 1

1under Q / GMA News TV

Japanese dramas
 Chibi Maruko-chan (TV drama)1
 Hana Kimi Japan1
 Hana Yori Dango1
 Hana Yori Dango 21
 Love Generation1
 Nobuta wo Produce1
 Operation Love1
 Summer Snow1

1under Q / GMA News TV

Chinese dramas
 Love O2O1
 Count Your Lucky Stars 2

1under Q /  GMA News TV
2 under A2Z

Lakorn (Thailand Novelas)
 F4 Thailand: Boys Over Flowers2
Hidden Love1
 Nakee1
 You're My Destiny1

1under Q /  GMA News TV
2 under A2Z

Taiwanese dramas
 Fall in Love with Me1
 Lavender 1
 The Legend of Speed 1
 Meteor Garden 1
 Meteor Garden II 1
 Meteor Rain 1
 My MVP Valentine 1
 Reaching for the Stars 1
 The Magicians of Love 1
 Mouse Loves Rice 1

1under Q / GMA News TV

Australian
Bert's Family Feud 1
H2O: Just Add Water1

1 under Q / GMA News TV

Telenovelas
Amanda O 1
Cabecita 1
Camila 1
Endless Christmas 1
Ka Ina 1
Mariana 1
Marina 1
 Mariú (2002-2003) 2
Mr. and Mrs. Pells 1
Sítio do Picapau Amarelo (adaptation of Monteiro Lobato's children books with the same title) 1
Rosalinda 1

1 under Q / GMA News TV
2 under ZOE TV 11

Canadian
 Edgemont (2002-2004, UniversiTV from 2006 to 2008) 2
Just For Laughs Gags (2007-2011) 1

1 under Q / GMA News TV
2 under ZOE TV 11

TV Specials

Entertainment
1MX Manila 2021 (January 9–10, 2022)1
 ASAP Natin 'to! Presents: Kapamilya Forever Day (July 11, 2021)1
Andito Tayo Para sa Isa't-Isa: The ABS-CBN Christmas Special 2021 (December 18, 2021)1
Binibining Pilipinas (2021–present)1
Dua Lipa: Studio 2054 Concert (April 18, 2021)1
Miss Universe (2021–present)1
 MMK: Grand Kumustahan (December 24, 2022)1
1MX Manila 2021 (January 15–16, 2022)1
Ikaw ang Liwanag at Ligaya: The 2020 ABS-CBN Christmas Special (December 20, 2020)1
 Pinoy Big Brother: Connect @ The Big Night (March 14, 2021)1
 Panata sa Bayan: 2022 KBP Presidential Forum (February 4, 2022) 1
 Harapan 2022 (March 28, 2022–April 7, 2022) 1
 Tayo ang Ligaya ng Isa't Isa: The ABS-CBN Christmas Special 2022 (December 17–18, 2022) 1

1 under A2Z

Sports
 Game! 
 News TV All Sports 
 Shakey's V-League (2013–2015) 1
 The Legend Vs The Olympian: Pacquiao Vs Ugas Boxing Fight Special Coverage (August 22, 2021) 2
 Maharlika Pilipinas Basketball League (February-March 2021) 
2
 Philippine Secondary Schools Basketball Championship: Battle of Champions (2013) 1
 Sports Pilipinas (2012–2014) 1
 TKO: Tanghali Knockouts: Matira Matibay (2013–2014) 1
 Who's Next? Pro-Boxing Series (2016–2017) 1
1 under Q / GMA News TV
2 under A2Z

See also
 List of programs broadcast by ABS-CBN
 List of programs aired by A2Z (Philippine TV channel)
 List of programs previously broadcast by QTV, Q, GMA News TV and GTV]
 List of programs broadcast by A2Z (Philippine TV channel)
 List of programs broadcast by Light TV

References

ABS-CBN
  
Z
GMA News TV
Philippine television-related lists